History of rugby may refer to:

History of rugby league
History of rugby union
History of Rugby, Warwickshire